Jupiter LIV, originally known as S/2016 J 1, is an outer natural satellite of Jupiter. It was discovered by Scott S. Sheppard in 2016, but not announced until June 2, 2017 via a Minor Planet Electronic Circular from the Minor Planet Center. It is about 1 kilometer in diameter and orbits at a semi-major axis of about 20,650,845 km with an inclination of about 139.8°. It belongs to the Ananke group.

References

Ananke group
Moons of Jupiter
Irregular satellites
Discoveries by Scott S. Sheppard
20160308
Moons with a retrograde orbit